"Generation Sex" is a song by the Divine Comedy. It was the first single from the album Fin de Siècle and features narration by presenter and columnist Katie Puckrik. It reached number nineteen on the UK Singles Chart.

The B-sides "Time Lapse" and "Chasing Sheep Is Best Left to Shepherds" are cover versions of music written by composer Michael Nyman for Peter Greenaway films. "Time Lapse" comes from A Zed & Two Noughts while "Chasing Sheep..." is from The Draughtsman's Contract.

Critical reception
In an AllMusic review, critic Matthew Greenwald wrote that "Generation Sex" paints "a picture of hedonism in the late 20th century, as well as its affect on the media." He noted that the song shows "Neil Hannon's black humor" and that overall is "an accurate account of the financially advantaged and over-sexed."

Track listing 
7" (SET050)
 Generation Sex
 Postcard to Rosie

CD1 (SETCDA050) 
 Generation Sex
 London Irish
 Time Lapse

CD2 (SETCDB050) 
 Generation Sex
 Chasing Sheep Is Best Left to Shepherds
 Little Acts of Kindness

CD (French Promo) (SA4428)
 Generation Sex

References 

1998 singles
The Divine Comedy (band) songs
Songs written by Neil Hannon
Setanta Records singles
1998 songs